The Reid Concert Hall is a small music venue in the city of Edinburgh, Scotland. Originally opened in 1859 as the Reid School of Music by the university's professor of music, John Donaldson (1789-1865), it was designed by the Scottish Architect David Cousin and is a Category A listed building. The hall is named after General John Reid, an army officer and musician who founded the Chair of Music (Reid Professor of Music) at the university. The Reid Concerts take place every 13 February.

Performances
The Reid Hall is hosts a number of classical chamber music concerts throughout the year, mostly performed by students and academics. The Reid Concerts are performed every year under the organisation of the Reid Professor. They are held on 13 February in remembrance of General John Reid and in line with the terms of his bequest that established the professorship.

In its history a number of works by Kenneth Leighton were premiered at the Reid Hall. After the composer's death, the hall hosted a memorial concert performed by Wakefield Cathedral Choir.

During the Edinburgh Festival Fringe, the Reid Hall is used as a performance venue called "The Cowbarn" by Underbelly.

Architecture

The Reid School of Music is a tall, rectangular sandstone ashlar building, designed by David Cousin in an Italianate Neoclassical style. The exterior large sash windows are flanked by decorative shell-headed niches. The roof is surrounded with an ornate, dentilled cornice and heavy, bracketed eaves, below which is an inscription carved into the frieze, "". Steps lead up to the entrances, which are flanked by pairs of classical columns and topped with porticos.

The interior consists mostly of a spacious concert hall, which is noted for its highly decorated neoclassical coffered tunnel vaulted ceiling. Against the east wall of the concert hall is a reproduction classical organ, which was built by Jürgen Ahrend in 1978. The wooden casing was designed by James Haig Marshall of Ian G Lindsay and Partners. The concert hall was designed to offer "dry" acoustics with low reverberation. By contrast, the neighbouring McEwan Hall opened in 1897 is a grand, colossal space with high reverberation.

Music museum
When the Reid Hall was built, Professor John Donaldson (1789-1865) also added a museum gallery to display his private collection of  old and unusual musical instruments. The Reid Hall is considered to be the oldest purpose-built musical museum in Europe. Today, the North Room houses the John Donaldson Collection of Musical Instruments, which, along with the Russell Collection, forms part of the Musical Instruments collection of the University of Edinburgh.

See also 
 List of music museums
St Cecilia's Hall

References

External links

Music venues in Edinburgh
Former churches in Scotland
Neoclassical architecture in Scotland
Buildings and structures of the University of Edinburgh
Italianate architecture in Scotland
Museums in Edinburgh
Music museums in Scotland
University museums in Scotland
1859 establishments in Scotland
Musical instrument museums in Scotland
Buildings and structures completed in 1859